Sandra Hengst  (born 12 April 1973) is a German women's international footballer who plays as a midfielder. She is a member of the Germany women's national football team. She was part of the team at the 1991 FIFA Women's World Cup. On club level she plays for KBC Duisburg in Germany.

References

1973 births
Living people
German women's footballers
Germany women's international footballers
Place of birth missing (living people)
1991 FIFA Women's World Cup players
Women's association football midfielders
UEFA Women's Championship-winning players